Peculier  may refer to:
 A Peculier is an ecclesiastical district, parish, chapel or church outside the jurisdiction of the bishop of the diocese in which it is situated.
 A Royal Peculier, an area including one or more places of worship under the jurisdiction of the British monarchy
 Old Peculier, is a beer brewed by Theakston Brewery, named in honour of the Peculier of Masham

See also
Peculiar (disambiguation)